Pristurus schneideri is a species of lizard in the family Sphaerodactylidae. The species is endemic to Yemen.

Etymology
The specific name, schneideri, is in honor of German herpetologist Wolfgang Schneider of the Hessisches Landesmuseum in Darmstadt.

Geographic range
P. schneideri is found on Hanish al Kabir Island, Yemen.

Habitat

Reproduction
P. schneideri is oviparous.

References

Further reading
Rösler H, Böhme W, Köhler J (2008). "A new species of the diurnal gekkonid genus Pristurus Rüppell, 1835 from the Red Sea island Hanish al-Kabir, Yemen". Amphibia-Reptilia 29 (2): 217–227. (Pristurus schneideri, new species).

Pristurus
Reptiles described in 2008